Estemmenosuchidae is an extinct family of large, very early herbivorous therapsids that flourished during the Guadalupian period. They are distinguished by horn-like structures, probably for display or agonistic behavior. Apart from the best known genus, Estemmenosuchus, the group is poorly known. To date, their fossils are known only from the Perm region of Russia (a region referred to by Russian paleontologists as the Cis-Urals).

Description
Estemmenosuchids are among the most distinctive of the Permian tetrapods. The high and massive skull is equipped with a number of horns projecting both upwards and outwards, which were probably used for intra-specific display. The incisors and canine teeth are large, but those at the side are reduced, with a serrated apex, and may have helped to break up plant material, although they were too small to be of much use. The body is large and bulky, indicating a large digestive tract for digesting volumes of plant food. The skull superficially resembles that of Styracocephalus, but the "horns" are formed from different bones.

Evolutionary Relationships
Estemmenosuchids belong to the Dinocephalian group, a group of early, primitive, but diverse therapsids – often of large size – that are known only from the Middle Permian period. They are however far more primitive and unspecialised than the better known dinocephalians of the South African Karoo (Beaufort Group), and mostly lived somewhat earlier.  They are also unusual in that, despite their primitive nature and early date of appearance, they show herbivorous adaptations.

Because of this, there have been two main interpretations of their evolutionary relationships with other Dinocephalia.

Hopson and Barghusen in 1986, who provided the first cladistic study of the Therapsida, coined the term Tapinocephalia for herbivorous dinocephalians, as opposed to the "Anteosauria" for the carnivorous forms. They suggested that Estemmenosuchids are very early/primitive members of the Tapinocephalia.

However Thomas Kemp (1982) and Gillian King (1988) argue instead that the Estemmenosuchidae are the most basal Dinocephalia, being more primitive than both the Anteosauria and the Tapinocephalia.

Ecological succession
The Estemmenosuchids replaced the caseids as the dominant megaherbivores of the Wordian age (middle of the Middle Permian), before being themselves replaced by the Tapinocephalidae during the Capitanian age (late Middle Permian).

See also
 Permian tetrapods

References

General references

 Olsen, E. C. (1962). "Late Permian terrestrial vertebrates, USA and USSR." Transactions of the American Philosophical Society 52: 1–224.
 Rubidge, B.S. & Sidor, C.A.  (2001). "Evolutionary patterns among Permo-Triassic therapsids." Annual Review of Ecology and Systematics 32: 449–480.

External links
 Palaeos – detailed description
 Kheper – an earlier page, which was incorporated into the Palaeos material (above)

Tapinocephalians
Guadalupian first appearances
Guadalupian extinctions
Prehistoric therapsid families